Jaromír (died 4 November 1038), a member of the Přemyslid dynasty, was Duke of Bohemia in 1003, from 1004 to 1012, and again from 1034 to 1035.

Early life 
He was the second son of Duke Boleslaus II the Pious (d. 999). His mother may have been either one of his father's two wives: Adiva or Emma of Mělník.

In 1002, Jaromír rebelled against the rule of his elder brother Boleslaus III, who had him castrated and expelled with his mother and his brother Oldřich to the Bavarian court at Regensburg. Nevertheless, Boleslaus was unable to secure the Prague throne, as he was deposed by the Bohemian nobility and his rule was taken over by his Přemyslid cousin Vladivoj, backed by the Polish duke Bolesław I the Brave. Vladivoj also secured the support of King Henry II of Germany when he received the Duchy of Bohemia as a royal fief.

Reign 
When Vladivoj died the next year, Jaromír and Oldřich returned to Bohemia and Jaromír was proclaimed duke by the Bohemian nobles. The Bohemian lands were occupied in turn by the Polish forces of Bolesław, who reinstated Boleslaus III as duke. After he ordered a massacre of the rival Vršovci clan, however, he lost the support of the Polish ruler and was finally deprived of power. Meanwhile, Jaromír had sought military backing from King Henry II. At Merseburg, he promised to hold Bohemia as a vassal of the king. This action definitively placed Bohemia within the jurisdiction of the Holy Roman Empire.

In 1004, Jaromír occupied Prague with a German army and proclaimed himself Bohemian duke. Nevertheless, the state he regained was a small one, as Polish forces still held Moravia, Silesia, and Lusatia. Jaromír's reign—like so many of the other early Czech rulers—was a struggle to regain lost lands. He remained a loyal supporter of King Henry in the smouldering German–Polish War. Nonetheless, the German king took no action when, in 1012, Jaromír was dethroned by Oldřich (who had him blinded) and forced once again into exile. In a surprise campaign, Jaromír once again managed to depose Oldřich with the support of Emperor Conrad II in 1033, but his second reign was short-lived. A year later, Oldřich was restored by his son Bretislaus I.

Jaromír was imprisoned at Lysá nad Labem and died on 4 November 1035 or 1038, a year after the death of his brother. He was assassinated by one of the Vršovci clan.

Notes

References 

Christian monarchs
Dukes of Bohemia
1035 deaths
Assassinated royalty
Burials at St. George's Basilica, Prague
Castrated people
Year of birth unknown